was a Japanese actor and voice actor from Kitakyūshū, affiliated with the self-founded Ken Production.

He was best known for his roles in Sally the Witch (1966) (as Sally's Papa), Fist of the North Star (as Raoh and Kaioh), Dr. Slump Arale-chan (as Senbei Norimaki), the Dragon Ball series (as Shenlong, Commander Red, Reacoom and the Tenkaichi Budōkai announcer), Fullmetal Alchemist (as Alex Louis Armstrong) and Hajime no Ippo (as Coach Kamogawa). He was also known for dubbing over the voices of actors Carl Weathers, Steve McQueen, Jack Nicholson, Sammy Davis, Jr., Victor Mature and Robert Shaw in the Japanese-language editions of their films.

He received a lifetime achievement award at the third Seiyu Awards.

Personal life 
He was married to fellow voice actor Michiko Nomura until his death.

Death 
He died from peritoneal cancer at 3:01 PM in JST on June 13, 2013.

Voice roles

Television animation 
1963
 Wolf Boy Ken (One-Eyed Jack)
1965
 Uchuu Patrol Hopper (Aian)
 Space Ace (Ibo)
1966
 Yusei Kamen (Sutekkyi)
 Mahōtsukai Sally (Maou)
1967
 Ogon Bat (Mazo)
 Speed Racer (Detective Rokugo)
 Bōken Shōnen Shadar (Gosuta)
1968
 Kyojin no Hoshi (Fumio Fujimura)
 Cyborg 009 (Albert Heinrich/004)
 Sabu to Ichi Torimono Hikae (Kijuro)
1969
 Kurenai Sanshiro (Narrator)
1973
 Zero Tester (Gallos Musha)
 Shinzo Ningen Casshan (BuraiKing Boss)
1975
 Ganba no Bōken (Yoisho)
 Uchū no Kishi Tekkaman (Chief Tenchi)
1976
 Magnos The Robot (Mamoru Kagetsu, Emperor Isar)
1977
 Chō Denji Machine Voltes V (General Do Bergan)
 Shin Kyojin no Hoshi (Big Bill Thunder)
1978
 Lupin III: Part II (African National Jail Chief, Chantie)
 Tōshō Daimos (Barandoku)
1979
 The Ultraman (Daisuke Oogawara)
 Animation Kikō Marco Polo no Bōken (Jafadi)
 Heroes of Tomorrow (Director Matsumoto)
 Entaku no Kishi Monogatari: Moero Arthur (Guster, Labick)
 The Rose of Versailles (General de Jarjeyes)
1980
 Adventures of Tom Sawyer (Joe Ianjean)
 Don de la Mancha (Don Quixote de la Mancha)
 Dracula: Sovereign of the Damned (Dracula)
 New Tetsujin-28 (Space Demon King)
1981
 Dr. Slump (Senbei Norimaki)
 Dasshu Kappei (Joe Cocker)
1982
 Don Dracula (Don Dracula)
 Space Adventure Cobra (Tavege)
1983
 Mirai Keisatsu Urashiman (Brynner, Keiji Koronda)
 Paaman (Don Ishikawa)
 Cat's Eye (Chief)
1984
 Higeyo Saraba (Kuro Hige)
 Twin Hawks (Akemi Hanazono)
 Fist of the North Star (Raoh)
1985
 Touch (Eiichirou Kashiwaba)
 Pro Golfer Saru (Mister X)
 Shōwa Ahōzoshi Akanuke Ichiban! (B. B. Mask, Kyouroku Ichinose)
 Highschool! Kimengumi (Yukio Hirayama)
1986
 Dragon Ball (Shenlong, Tenkaichi Budōkai Announcer, Commander Red, Senbei Norimaki, Mutaito)
 Seishun Anime Zenshu (Boushi no Borei)
 Coral Reef Legend: Elfie of the Blue Sea (Charisma)
1987
 Fist of the North Star 2 (Kaioh)
 The Story of Fifteen Boys (Warston)
1988
 Tatakae!! Ramenman (Tosatsuki Gyokuou)
 Soreike! Anpanman (Kurayamiman)
 Saint Seiya (Odin)
1989
 Dragon Ball Z (Shenlong, Reacoom)
 Mahōtsukai Sally (Daimao)
 Warau Salesman (Mamoru Kigami)
 Magical Hat (Jack)
1990
 Dragon Quest (Ortega)
1991
 Dragon Quest: Dai no Daibōken (The Dark King Vearn)
1994
 Akazukin Cha Cha (Clyde)
 Tottemo! Luckyman (Earthquake Man)
1995
 Street Fighter II V (M. Bison/Vega)
1997
 Lupin III: Island of Assassins (Gold)
 Berserk (Zodd the Immortal)
1998
 Cowboy Bebop (Appledelhi) (ep. 24)
 Saber Marionette J to X (Kamatarou Hanagata)
1999
 Flint: The Time Detective (Leonardo da Vinci)
 Angel Links (Duuz)
 Monster Rancher (Rau Leader)
 Weekly Story Land (Narrator)
2000
 Shinzo (Insect King Dokkaku)
 Hajime no Ippo (Genji Kamogawa)
2001
 Rune Soldier (King Rijarl)
 Cyborg 009 The Cyborg Soldier (President)
2002
 RahXephon (Shirow Watari)
 Ai Yori Aoshi (Aoi's Father)
 Petite Princess Yucie (Demon King)
2003
 Hajime no Ippo: Champion Road (Genji Kamogawa)
 Bōken Yūki Pluster World (Gingiragin)
 Tank Knights Portriss (Jerid)
 Tank Knights Portriss (Jerid)
 FireStorm (Carlo Morrelli)
 Astro Boy (Tokugawa)
 Gad Guard (Radig)
 Cinderella Boy (Kantarou Shirayuki)
 Fullmetal Alchemist (Alex Louis Armstrong)
2004
 Kaiketsu Zorori (Dalmanian)
 Paranoia Agent (Kawazu)
 Tetsujin 28 (Velanade)
 Black Jack (Keiji Tomobiki)
2005
 Gallery Fake (Carlos)
 Basilisk (Nenki Mino)
 Shinshaku Sengoku Eiyū Densetsu (Narrator)
 The Snow Queen (Gaion)
 Kotenkotenko (Tree)
2006
 Angel Heart (Bando Sanemichi)
 Red Bull (CM Narrator)
 Black Jack 21 (Inspector Tomobiki) (eps. 1, 3)
 Kemonozume (Kyuutarou Ohba)
2007
 D.Gray-man (Giscone)
 Jūsō Kikō Dancouga Nova (Herugaiya)
 Mokke (Rokusan)
2008
 Noramimi (Director)
 Allison & Lillia (Police Inspector Warren)
 Golgo 13 (Ledell Nikolavitch) (ep. 5)
 Casshern Sins (Braikingboss)
 One Outs (Saikawa Owner)
2009
 Hajime no Ippo: New Challenger (Genji Kamogawa)
 Slayers Evolution-R (Dune)
 Shin Mazinger Shōgeki! Z-Hen (Hades/Emperor of Darkness)
 Dragon Ball Kai (Shenlong)
 Fullmetal Alchemist: Brotherhood (Alex Louis Armstrong, Philip Gargantos Armstrong)
 Needless (Gido)
 Kämpfer (Hiaburi Lion)
 Kiddy Girl-and (Q-feuille)
2010
 Shimajirou Hesoka (Captain Kurobuta)
 Mayoi Neko Overrun! (Machine Duke)
 Rio – Rainbow Gate! (Jimmy)
2011
 Beelzebub (Kusubonobu, Wasboga)
 Blade (Tanba Yagyu) (ep. 9)
 Hunter × Hunter (2011) (Captain)
2013
 Silver Spoon (Todoroki Sensei)

 OVA 
 Bavi Stock (1985) (Secretary)
 Outlanders (1986) (Geobaldi)
 Detonator Orgun (1991) (Zoa)
 Casshan: Robot Hunter (1993) (Braiking Boss)
 JoJo's Bizarre Adventure (1993) (Daniel J. D'Arby)
 Macross Plus (1994) (Col. Millard Johnson)
 Shin Getter Robo vs. Neo Getter Robo (2000) (Emperor Goru)
 Hajime no Ippo: Mashiba vs. Kimura (2003) (Genji Kamogawa)
 Mudazumo Naki Kaikaku (2010) (Chairman Mao)
 Legend of Galactic Heroes (1988–1997; 1999–2000) (Sidney Sithole)

 Theatrical animation 
1966
 Cyborg 009 – 008
1967
 Cyborg 009 and the Monster Wars – 008
1969
 Puss 'n Boots – Daniel
1970
 Chibikko Remi to Meiken Kapi – James
1971
 Alibaba to Yonjubiki no Tozuku – Dora
1975
 Uchuu Enban Dai-Senso – Blackey
1981
 Doraemon: Nobita no Uchū Kaitakushi – Borgand
 Sea Prince and the Fire Child – Glaucos
 Dr. Slump & Arale-chan Hello! Fushigi Jima – Senbei Norimaki
1982
 Techno Police 21C – Goro Narumi
 Dr. Slump: Hoyoyo! Space Adventure – Senbei Norimaki
1983
 Harmagedon – Salamander
 Dr. Slump & Arale-chan Hoyoyo! Sekai Issuu Dai Race – Senbei Norimaki
1984
 Shounen Keniya – Gure of the Pora tribe
 Dr. Slump & Arale-chan Hoyoyo! Nanaba Shiro no Hihou – Senbei Norimaki
1985
 Pro Golfer Saru: Super Golf World e no Chōsen!! – Mr. X
1986
 Dragon Ball: Curse of the Blood Rubies – Shenlong
 Fist of the North Star – Raoh
1987
 Pro Golfer Saru: Kōga Hikyō! Kage no Ninpō Golfer Sanjō! – Mr. X
1988
 Dragon Ball: Mystical Adventure – Senbei Norimaki, Shenlong, Tenkaichi Budōkai announcer
1989
 Little Nemo: Adventures in Slumberland – King Morpheus
 Dragon Ball Z: Dead Zone – Shenlong
 Garaga – Daraburigu
1990
 Dragon Ball Z: The World's Strongest – Shenlong
 Dragon Ball Z: The Tree of Might – Raisin, Shenlong
1991
 Dragon Ball Z: Lord Slug – Shenlong
 Gamba to Kawauso no Bōken – Yoisho
 Adachi-ga Hara – Damokuresu
1992
 Dragon Quest: Dai no Daibōken Buchiya bure!! Shinsei Rokudai Shoguo – Burn
1993
 Dr. Slump & Arale-chan Ncha! Penguin Mura wa Hare no chi Hare – Senbei Norimaki
 Dr. Slump & Arale-chan Ncha! Penguin Mura yori Ai o Komete – Senbei Norimaki
1994
 Fatal Fury: The Motion Picture – Jamin Shona
1995
 Macross Plus Movie Edition – Col. Millard Johnson
1996
 Dragon Ball: The Path to Power – Commander Red
 Doraemon: Nobita's Galactic Express – Heavenly King
 Slayers Return – Galev
1997
 Doraemon: Nobita's Adventure in Clockwork City – Onigorou Kumatora
 Hermes – Winds of Love – King Minos
1998
 Case Closed: The Fourteenth Target – Nagaaki Shishido
 Welcome to Lodoss Island! – King Fern
1999
 Doraemon: Nobita Drifts in the Universe – Angle Moa
2000
 One Piece: The Movie – El Drago
2004
 Crayon Shin-chan: Arashi o Yobu! Yūhi no Kasukabe Boys – Vin
2005
 Fullmetal Alchemist: The Movie – Conqueror of Shamballa – Alex Louis Armstrong
 Black Jack: The Two Doctors Of Darkness – Inspector Tomobiki
2006
 Doraemon: Nobita's Dinosaur 2006 – Dolman Stein
2007
 Tetsujin 28-go: Hakuchū no Zangetsu – Beranedo
 Nezumi Monogatari – Alex
2009
 Yona Yona Penguin – Uncle 2
2010
 Crayon Shin-chan: Chō Jikū! Arashi o Yobu Ora no Hanayome – Mazusou Kinyuu
2011
 Fullmetal Alchemist: The Sacred Star of Milos – Alex Louis Armstrong
 Pokémon the Movie: Black/White – Victini and Reshiram/Zekrom – King of the People of the Vale
2012
 Guskō Budori no Denki – Fisherman factory owner
2013
 Dragon Ball Z: Battle of Gods – Shenlong

 Video games 
1994
 Dragon Ball Z: Buyuu Retsuden (Mega Drive) – Reacoom, Shenlong
1995
 Kuusou Kagaku Sekai: Gulliver Boy – Kong
 Dragon Ball Z: Ultimate Battle 22 – Shenlong
 Linda Cube – Captain Ben
 Dragon Ball Z: Shin Butōden (Sega Saturn) – Shenlong
 Hokuto no Ken (Sega Saturn, PlayStation) – Zen-oh
1996
 Dragon Ball Z: Idainaru Dragon Ball Densetsu (PlayStation, Sega Saturn) – Reacoom, Shenlong
1997
 Macross Digital Mission VF-X – Captain
 Next King: Koi no Sennen Oukoku – King Henry King
 Linda Cube Again – Captain Ben
 Tales of Destiny – Hugo Jirukurisuto, Shine Rembrandt
1998
 Kasei Monogatari – Kiwi 65 World
1999
 Yuukyuu no Eden – Orchid Grace
 Sword of the Berserk: Guts' Rage – Balzac, Zodd
 Spyro 2: Ripto's Rage! – Ripto
 Space Channel 5 – Chief Blank
2000
 Hokuto no Ken: Seikimatsu Kyūseishu Densetsu (PlayStation) – Raoh
 Bōken Jidai Katsugeki Goemon (Toranou)
2001
 Harry Potter and the Sorcerer's Stone (Voldemort)
2002
 Kidou Senshi Gundam Senki: Lost War Chronicles (Douglas Roden)
2003
 Dragon Ball Z – Reacoom
 Rahxephon Soukyuu Fantasy – Shiro Watari
 Hot Shots Golf Fore! – Z, Vader
 Fullmetal Alchemist and the Broken Angel – Alex Louis Armstrong
2004
 Dragon Ball Z 2 – Reacoom
 Fullmetal Alchemist: Dream Carnival – Alex Armstrong
 Fullmetal Alchemist 2: Curse of the Crimson Elixir – Alex Louis Armstrong
 Berserk: Millennium Falcon Hen Seima Senki no Shou – Balzac, Zodd
 Metal Gear Solid 3: Snake Eater – Yevgeny Borisovitch Volgin
2005
 Dragon Ball Z 3 – Reacoom, Shenlong, Commander Red
 Fullmetal Alchemist 3: Kami o Tsugu Shoujo – Alex Louis Armstrong
 Dragon Ball Z: Sparking! – Reacoom, Shenlong
 Rogue Galaxy – Vuarugogu Doreiza
 Hokuto no Ken (arcade game) – Raoh
2006
 Super Dragon Ball Z – Shenlong
 Dragon Ball Z: Sparking! Neo – Shenlong, Reacoom
 Sonic the Hedgehog (2006 video game) – Duke of Soleanna
2007
 !Shin Chan: Flipa en colores! – Daly
 Dragon Ball Z: Sparking! Meteor – Reacoom, Shenlong, Senbei Norimaki
2008
 Ryu ga Gotoku Kenzan! – Bōtenkai Nankō
 Dragon Ball Z: Burst Limit – Reacoom
 Pro Golfer Saru – Mr. X
 Dragon Ball Z: Infinite World – Shenlong, Senbei Norimaki, Reacoom
 Dissidia Final Fantasy – Garland 
2009
 Killzone 2 – Scalar Vuisari
 Dragon Ball Tenkaichi Daibōken – Commander Red, Shenlong, Tenkaichi Budōkai announcer
 Hagane no Renkinjutsushi: Fullmetal Alchemist – Akatsuki no Ouji  Alex Louis Armstrong
 Fullmetal Alchemist: Daughter of the Dusk – Alex Louis Armstong
 Dragon Ball: Raging Blast – Shenlong
2010
 Hagane no Renkinjutsushi: Senaka o Takuseshimono – Alex Louis Armstrong
 ModNation Racers – Chief
 Dragon Ball: Raging Blast 2 – Shenlong, Tenkaichi Budōkai announcer
2011
 Dissidia 012 Final Fantasy – Garland
 Final Fantasy Type-0 – Military Command Manager
 Dragon Ball Ultimate Blast – Shenlong, Tenkaichi Budōkai announcer
2012
 Ryū ga Gotoku 5 – Tadashi Madarame
2013
 Heroes VS. – Alien Empera
 Killzone: Mercenary – Scalar Vuisari

 Tokusatsu 
1966
 Ultra Q (Huku Suzuki Captain (Actor by:Jun Kuroki))
1979
 The 6 Ultra Brothers vs. the Monster Army (Notice Narrator)
 Ultraman: Great Monster Decisive Battle (Notice Narrator)
1997
 Ultraman Tiga & Ultraman Dyna: Warriors of the Star of Light (Notice Narrator)
2007
 Ultraman Mebius (Alien Empera)
2011
 Kaizoku Sentai Gokaiger the Movie: The Flying Ghost Ship (Ghost Ship Captain Los Dark)

 Dubbing roles 

 Live-action 
 Steve McQueen
 The Magnificent Seven (1974 TV Asahi edition) – Vin
 Hell Is for Heroes (1973 Fuji TV edition) – Pvt. John Reese
 The Cincinnati Kid (1973 TV Asahi edition) – Eric "The Kid" Stoner
 Bullitt (1977 TV Asahi edition) – Frank Bullitt
 The Getaway (1982 TV Asahi edition) – Carter 'Doc' McCoy
 Junior Bonner (1976 TV Asahi edition) – Junior 'J.R.' Bonner
 Papillon (1977 TV Asahi edition) – Henri 'Papillon' Charrière
 The Towering Inferno (1989 TBS edition) – Michael O'Hallorhan
 The Hunter (1987 TV Asahi edition) – Ralph 'Papa' Thorson
 Tom Horn – Tom Horn
 Bob Hoskins
 Who Framed Roger Rabbit – Detective Eddie Valiant
 Hook – Smee
 Mrs Henderson Presents – Vivian Van Damm
 Son of the Mask – Odin
 Unleashed (2007 TV Tokyo edition) – Bart
 Carl Weathers
 Rocky (1983 TBS edition) – Apollo Creed
 Rocky II (1984 TBS edition) – Apollo Creed
 Rocky III (1987 TBS edition) – Apollo Creed
 Rocky IV (1989 TBS and 1995 TV Asahi editions) – Apollo Creed
 Predator (1989 Fuji TV edition) – George Dillon
 Action Jackson (1991 Fuji TV edition) – Jericho "Action" Johnson
 John Rhys-Davies
 The Lord of the Rings: The Fellowship of the Ring – Gimli
 The Lord of the Rings: The Two Towers – Gimli
 The Lord of the Rings: The Return of the King – Gimli
 Dragon Storm – King Fastrad
 Jack Nicholson
 The Witches of Eastwick (1990 TBS edition) – Daryl Van Horne
 Batman (1995 TV Asahi edition) – The Joker
 The Bucket List (2010 TV Asahi edition) – Edward Cole
 John Saxon
 Battle Beyond the Stars (1983 TV Asahi edition) – Sador
 Black Christmas (TV Asahi edition) – Lt. Kenneth Fuller
 The Electric Horseman (1985 TV Asahi edition) – Hunt Sears
 Enter the Dragon (1979 TV Asahi edition) – Roper
 Danny Glover
 ER – Charlie Pratt
 Grand Canyon – Simon
 Flight of the Intruder (1995 Fuji TV edition) – Commander Frank "Dooke" Camparelli
 Witness (1987 Fuji TV edition) – Lieutenant James McFee
 Predator 2 (DVD edition) – Lieutenant Mike Harrigan
 Burt Reynolds
 Shamus (1978 TBS edition) – Shamus McCoy
 Gator (1980 TBS edition) – Gator McClusky
 City Heat (1988 Fuji TV edition) – Mike Murphy
 Charles S. Dutton
 Alien 3 (Theatrical and 1996 Fuji TV edition) – Leonard Dillon
 Black Dog (2002 NTV edition) – FBI Agent Allen Ford
 Mimic (2006 TV Tokyo edition) – Leonard
 Paul Winfield
 The Serpent and the Rainbow (1991 Fuji TV edition) – Lucien Celine
 Cliffhanger (1995 Fuji TV edition) – Walter Wright
 The Terminator (2003 TV Tokyo edition) – Ed Traxler
 Michael Ironside
 Scanners (1987 NTV edition) – Darryl Revok
 Total Recall (1992 VHS edition) – Richter
 Highlander II: The Quickening (1996 NTV edition) – General Katana
 Ernie Hudson
 The Substitute (1998 Fuji TV edition) – Principal Claude Rolle
 The Watcher (2002 TV Tokyo edition) – FBI Special Agent in Charge Mike Ibby
 Dragonball Evolution – Sifu Norris
 Billy Dee Williams
 The Take (1986 TV Asahi edition) – Lt. Terrence Sneed
 The Empire Strikes Back (1986 NTV edition) – Lando Calrissian
 Nighthawks (1987 TV Asahi edition) – Matthew Fox
 Return of the Jedi (1988 NTV edition) – Lando Calrissian
 Oceans of Fire (1989 TV Asahi edition) – Jim McKinley
 Laurence Fishburne
 The Matrix (2002 Fuji TV edition) – Morpheus
 The Matrix Reloaded (2006 Fuji TV edition) – Morpheus
 The Matrix Revolutions (2007 Fuji TV edition) – Morpheus
 Omar Sharif
 Lawrence of Arabia (1981 TV Asahi edition) – Sherif Ali
 Marco the Magnificent (1975 TV Asahi edition) – Sheik Alla Hou, 'The Desert Wind'
 More Than a Miracle –  Prince Rodrigo Fernandez
 10,000 BC (2011 TV Asahi edition) – Narrator
 Robert Shaw
 From Russia with Love (1975 and 1976 TBS editions) – Donald "Red" Grant
 Jaws (DVD and 1991 TBS editions) – Quint
 The Sting – Johnny "Kelly" Hooker
 Joe Don Baker
 The Living Daylights (1993 TBS edition) – Brad Whitaker
 Congo (1999 Fuji TV edition) – R.B. Travis
 Tomorrow Never Dies (2001 Fuji TV edition) – Jack Wade
 Ben-Hur (2000 TV Tokyo edition) – Sheik Ilderim (Hugh Griffith)
 Bill & Ted's Bogus Journey – Chuck De Nomolos (Joss Ackland)
 Cutthroat Island (1998 Fuji TV edition) – Douglas "Dawg" Brown (Frank Langella)
 Das Boot (1983 Fuji TV edition) – Kapitänleutnant (Jürgen Prochnow)
 Dawn of the Dead – Peter Washington (Ken Foree)
 Diamonds Are Forever (1990 TBS edition) – James Bond (Sean Connery)
 Die Hard – Sgt. Al Powell (Reginald VelJohnson))
 Die Hard (1992 Fuji TV edition) – Hans Gruber (Alan Rickman)
 Dune – Baron Vladimir Harkonnen (Kenneth McMillan)
 Exit Wounds (2004 NTV edition) – Chief Hinges (Bill Duke)
 First Blood (1999 NTV edition) – Sheriff Will Teasle (Brian Dennehy)
 Get Smart (2011 TV Asahi edition) – The President (James Caan)
 The Golden Compass – John Faa (Jim Carter)
 Hard to Kill (1994 TV Asahi edition) – Lieutenant Kevin O'Malley (Frederick Coffin)
 The Hard Way – The Party Crasher (Stephen Lang)
 Hot Shots! Part Deux – Saddam Hussein (Jerry Haleva)
 Jingle All the Way – Myron Larabee (Sinbad)
 Kenan & Kel – Roger Rockmore (Ken Foree)
 Little Shop of Horrors – Audrey II (Levi Stubbs))
 Live and Let Die (1981 and 1988 TBS editions) – Doctor Kananga / Mister Big (Yaphet Kotto)
 Love, Honour and Obey – Ray Kreed (Ray Winstone)
 Money Train (2000 Fuji TV edition) – Captain Donald Patterson (Robert Blake)
 Moonraker (1984 TBS edition) – Sir Hugo Drax (Michael Lonsdale)
 Never Say Never Again (1985 Fuji TV edition) – Maximillian Largo (Klaus Maria Brandauer)
 Nothing but Trouble – Judge Alvin 'J.P' Valkenheiser / Bobo (Dan Aykroyd)
 Ocean's Twelve (2007 NTV edition) – Reuben Tishkoff (Elliott Gould)
 Ra.One – Khalnayak (Sanjay Dutt))
 Robin Hood: Prince of Thieves (1996 Fuji TV edition) – Sheriff of Nottingham (Alan Rickman)
 Sledge Hammer! – Captain Trunk (Harrison Page)
 Snakes on a Plane – Agent Neville Flynn (Samuel L. Jackson)
 Star Trek: The Original Series – Montgomery "Scotty" Scott (James Doohan) (second voice)
 Thirteen Days (2003 TV Asahi edition) – Curtis LeMay (Kevin Conway)
 Tremors – Earl Basset (Fred Ward)
 Ultraman: The Ultimate Hero – Russel Edlund (Harrison Page)

 Animated 
 Dom DeLuise
 An American Tail (Tiger)
 An American Tail: Fievel Goes West (Tiger)
 Fievel's American Tails (Tiger)
 An American Tail: The Treasure of Manhattan Island (Tiger)
 An American Tail: The Mystery of the Night Monster (Tiger)
 Adventure Time (Narrator)
 The Adventures of Tintin (Captain Haddock)
 All Dogs Go to Heaven (Carface)
 Batman: The Animated Series (The Sewer King)
 Buzz Lightyear of Star Command: The Adventure Begins (Commander Nebula)
 Buzz Lightyear of Star Command (Commander Nebula)
 Dexter's Laboratory (Red Eye)
 Despicable Me (Mr. Perkins)
 DuckTales (Scrooge McDuck)
 DuckTales the Movie: Treasure of the Lost Lamp (Merlock)
 FernGully: The Last Rainforest (Hexxus)
 Iron Man (Dark Aegis)
 Pac-Man and the Ghostly Adventures (Kingpin Obtuse)
 Shrek series (Wolf)
 Tarzan (Kerchak)
 Tarzan II (Kerchak)
 Teenage Mutant Ninja Turtles (The Shredder)
 Thomas and Friends (Gordon the Big Engine (Seasons 1-8 only))
 Thomas and the Magic Railroad (Gordon the Big Engine)
 X-Men (Apocalypse)

 Commercials 
 Frosted Flakes (Corn Frosty (コーンフロスティ Kōn Furosuti)) – Tony the Tiger

 Television live-action 
 Fight! Dragon''

References

External links 
 

1937 births
2013 deaths
Male voice actors from Fukuoka Prefecture
Voice actors from Kitakyushu
Japanese male video game actors
Japanese male voice actors
Deaths from cancer in Japan
Deaths from peritoneal cancer
20th-century Japanese male actors
21st-century Japanese male actors
Ken Production voice actors